The USC Thornton School of Music is a private music school in Los Angeles, California. Founded in 1884 only four years after the University of Southern California, the Thornton School is the oldest continually operating arts institution in Los Angeles. The school is located on the USC University Park Campus, south of Downtown Los Angeles.

The Thornton School is noted for blending the rigors of a traditional conservatory-style education with a forward-looking approach to training the next generation of musicians. Highly regarded internationally, the school is widely ranked as one of the top 10 schools of music in the United States.

History 
The USC Thornton School of Music was founded in 1884 and dedicated in 1999. It was named in honor of philanthropist Flora L. Thornton following a $25 million gift from her foundation. At the time, this was the largest donation to a school of music in the United States. In 2006, she donated an additional $5 million to support the facility needs of the school.
 

In 2023, Jason King was announced as the new dean of USC Thornton, following Robert Cutietta stepping down at the end of 2022.

Programs 
USC Thornton offers Bachelor's, Master's and Doctorate degrees in more than 20 disciplines across the school's three divisions – Classical Performance and Composition, Contemporary Music, and Research and Scholarly Studies. Many disciplines also offer graduate certificates.

Thornton is one of the few highly-regarded music schools in the United States to offer a degree program in early music. Students of baroque, renaissance and medieval music (vocal or instrumental) may enroll in a specialized degree program.

Thornton was one of the first schools of music to offer an undergraduate program in music industry, a program still regarded as among the best in the country, and currently offers both a Bachelor of Science and a Master of Science in Music Industry. Thornton offers the only comprehensive program in Scoring for Television and Film. It also has a program in studio guitar performance.

In 2017, USC Thornton launched new professional master's degree programs in Arts Leadership; Community Music; and Music Industry, designed to train musicians in new ways to imagine a contemporary music career.

In 2018, USC Thornton announced a new model of classical music education for undergraduate Classical Performance and Composition students. Hallmarks of USC Thornton's redesigned curriculum include restructured lessons, rehearsals, and classes to prepare students for a vibrant career in music.

Performance halls and studios 

 Bing Theatre
 Bovard Auditorium
 Carson Center
 Joyce J. Cammilleri Hall
 MacDonald Hall
 Newman Hall
 Ramo Hall
 Schoenfeld Symphonic Hall
 Songwriter's Theater
 Tommy's Place

Faculty 
In 2007, USC Thornton alumnus and Distinguished Professor of Composition Morten Lauridsen became the eighth classical composer to receive the National Medal of Arts. Two years later, in 2009, alumnus and Judge Widney Professor of Music at USC Michael Tilson Thomas also received the National Medal of Arts.

The following list is limited to individuals who have articles in Wikipedia.

Choral Music
Suzi Digby
Jo-Michael Scheibe
Cristian Grases
Nick Strimple

Classical Guitar
Brian Head
William Kanengiser
Pepe Romero
Scott Tennant

Composition
Camae Ayewa
Stephen Hartke, Distinguished Professor Emeritus of Composition
Ted Hearne
Veronika Krausas
Morten Lauridsen, Distinguished Professor Emeritus of Composition
Frank Ticheli
Christopher Trapani
Nina C. Young

Conducting
Carl St.Clair
Michael Tilson Thomas, Judge Widney Professor of USC

Early Music

Jazz Studies
Peter Erskine
Russell Ferrante
Sara Gazarek
Jason Goldman
Alphonso Johnson
Andy Martin
Roy McCurdy
Vince Mendoza
Bob Mintzer
Darek Oles
Alan Pasqua
Bob Sheppard

Keyboard Studies
Michael Arrom
Stewart Gordon
Jeffrey Kahane
Daniel Pollack

Alan Louis Smith

Music Education
Robert Cutietta

Music Industry
Kevin Lyman
Brian Malouf
Richard Wolf

Musicology
Bruce Alan Brown

Organ Studies

Popular Music
Paul Jackson Jr.
Alphonso Johnson
Patrice Rushen

Screen Scoring
Laura Karpman
Garry Schyman
Christopher Young

Strings/Harp
Glenn Dicterow 
Karen Dreyfus
Ralph Kirshbaum 
Andrew Shulman
JoAnn Turovsky

Studio/Jazz Guitar
Bruce Forman
Frank Potenza
Richard Smith

Theory/Aural Skills
Brian Head
Veronika Krausas

Vocal Arts and Opera
Rod Gilfry

Winds and Percussion
Yehuda Gilad
Julie Landsman
Jim Self
Allan Vogel
James Walker

Notable alumni

Michael Abels, composer
Eric Abramovitz, principal clarinet Toronto Symphony Orchestra
Lorin Alexander, composer
Herb Alpert, trumpeter and co-founder of A&M Records
Piotr Anderszewski, pianist
Christophe Beck, film and television score composer
Marco Beltrami, film score composer
Alec Benjamin, singer and songwriter
Robert Bernhardt, conductor
Jerry Blackstone, choral conductor
Bruce Broughton, composer
Harold Budd, ambient/avant-garde composer
Roberto Cani, concertmaster, Los Angeles Opera Orchestra
Todd Carey, singer-songwriter and musician
Reeve Carney, singer-songwriter and musician
William Edward Childs, jazz pianist and composer
Nicolas Chumachenco, violinist
Gerald Clayton, jazz pianist
Louis Cole, multi-instrumentalist and singer-songwriter
Rozzi Crane, singer-songwriter
Daedelus, producer and multi-instrumentalist
Tamar Davis, R&B singer
John Dearman, classical guitarist
Martin Denny, creator of exotica music
Alan de Veritch, principal violist, New York Philharmonic; principal violist, Los Angeles Philharmonic
Glenn Dicterow, retired concertmaster, New York Philharmonic
Eldar Djangirov, jazz pianist
Dean Drummond, composer and conductor
William Eddins, conductor
Taylor Eigsti, jazz pianist
Jack Eskew, arranger/orchestrator
Flea (Michael Balzary), bassist, trumpeter and actor
Grace Fong, pianist and music educator 
Nmon Ford, baritone 
John Frizzell, film and television score composer
Neil Galanter, concert pianist
Kathryn Gallagher, singer and actress
Sara Gazarek, jazz musician and singer
Grant Gershon, conductor and pianist
Rod Gilfry, opera baritone
Renée Elise Goldsberry, actress
Jerry Goldsmith, film score composer
Ludwig Göransson, composer and conductor
Annie Gosfield, composer
Donald Grantham, composer and music educator
Maria Grenfell, composer
Danny Grissett, jazz pianist 
Tina Guo, cellist
Thomas Hampson, lyric baritone
Lionel Hampton, jazz musician
Lisa Harriton, singer, songwriter and keyboardist
Jane Henschel, soprano
Wataru Hokoyama, composer
Marilyn Horne, mezzo-soprano
James Horner, film score composer
James Newton Howard, film score composer 
Matthew Howard, principal percussion Los Angeles Philharmonic
Paul Jackson Jr., jazz fusion guitarist
Tommy Johnson, film and television tubist, tuba pedagogue
Martin Katz, piano accompanist, conductor and music educator
Vladimir Khomyakov, classical pianist
King Princess, singer and songwriter (incomplete degree)
Rudolf Koelman, violinist, professor and recording artist 
Thomas Kotcheff, composer
Robert Kral, film score composer
Giorgi Latso, concert pianist and composer
Morten Lauridsen, composer
Benjamin Lees, composer
Christopher Lennertz, film and television score composer
Charles Lloyd, jazz musician
Bear McCreary, television score composer
Mark McKenzie, composer
Angela Meade, Metropolitan Opera principal artist, soprano
Moontower, electro-pop trio
Ronald Muldrow, jazz musician
MUNA, electronic pop band
Roger Neill, film and television score composer
Kelley O'Connor, mezzo-soprano
Martin O'Donnell, composer for video games
Dwight Parry, principal oboe, Cincinnati Symphony Orchestra 
Christopher Parkening, classical guitarist
Leonard Pennario, pianist
Jeff Peterson, slack key guitarist
P. Q. Phan, composer of contemporary classical music
Cynthia Phelps, principal violist, New York Philharmonic 
Elizabeth Pitcairn, violinist
Harvey Pittel, saxophonist
Gene Pokorny, principal tuba, Chicago Symphony Orchestra
Basil Poledouris, film score composer
Harve Presnell, singer and actor
Brian Ralston, film score composer
Robert Ralston, pianist and organist
Lee Ritenour, session musician
Jessica Rivera, soprano
Leroy Robertson, composer and music educator
Robert Xavier Rodriguez, composer
Douglas Romayne, film and television score composer
Nathaniel Rosen, cellist
Elizabeth Rowe, principal flute, Boston Symphony Orchestra 
Patrice Rushen, R&B singer, songwriter, composer and pianist
Stefan Sanderling, conductor
Andrew Sandwick, bass clarinet Boston Symphony Orchestra
William Schmidt, composer
Garry Schyman, composer for film, television and video games
Tom Scott, session musician
Daniel Slatkin, film score composer
Jason Solowsky, film score composer  
Lya Stern, violinist
Thomas Stevens, trumpeter, composer and educator
Tomas Svoboda, composer and music educator
Salli Terri, singer and songwriter
Michael Tilson Thomas, conductor, composer and pianist
Fiona Thompson, cellist
Martin Tillman, composer and cellist
Oleg Timofeyev, musicologist and classical guitarist
Dale Turner, singer-songwriter, multi-instrumentalist and producer/arranger
Zeynep Üçbaşaran, pianist
Video Game Pianist (Martin Leung), classical pianist
Walter Werzowa, composer and founder of Musikvergnuegen
Mack Wilberg, conductor, composer and arranger; director, Mormon Tabernacle Choir
Remi Wolf, singer and songwriter
Andrew York, classical guitarist and composer
24kGoldn, artist and rapper (incomplete degree)

References

External links

USC Thornton Polish Music Center website
Screen Scoring website
Music Library at USC Libraries

Music schools in California
Music
Educational institutions established in 1884
University subdivisions in California
1884 establishments in California